Tobias Schilk (born 24 March 1992) is a German professional football coach and a former defender. He is the coach for youth team of Greuther Fürth.

Career
Born in Munich, Schilk began playing football for the youth side of TSV 1860 Munich. He played in the Regionalliga for the club's reserve team before joining 1. FC Heidenheim in the 3. Liga for the 2011–12 season. In January 2012, he signed for 1. FSV Mainz 05.

External links
 
 
 Tobias Schilk at Fupa

1992 births
Footballers from Munich
Living people
German footballers
Germany youth international footballers
Association football defenders
TSV 1860 Munich II players
1. FC Heidenheim players
1. FSV Mainz 05 II players
Hallescher FC players
3. Liga players
Regionalliga players
German football managers